Anthidium rodriguezi is a species of bee in the family Megachilidae, the leaf-cutter, carder, or mason bees.

Distribution
Guatemala
Honduras
Mexico

Distribution
Middle America

Synonyms
Synonyms for this species include:
Melanthidium carri Cockerell, 1947

References

rodriguezi
Insects described in 1912